The 2002–03 Kategoria e Dytë was the 56th season of a second-tier association football league in Albania.

Group B1 (North) 

 Shkodra was apparently excluded for financial reasons

Group B2 (Centre-East/East)

2nd place playoff 
 Played in Durrës on 29 May 2003.

Group B3 (Centre-West/South)

Championship playoff 

Note: Originally, first tie-breaker is goal difference, second penalty shoot-outs won; however, the Albanian Football Association was decided to have another play-off match instead.

Final

References

 Calcio Mondiale Web
 RSSSF.org

Kategoria e Parë seasons
2
Alba